Rachna Doab can be classified as one of the main regions of Punjab, Pakistan. Punjab historically has been divided into regions based on its various rivers, since the name Punjab is based on its five main rivers. Rachna doab includes all the area between the Chenab and Ravi Rivers, all the way from the Jammu Division till their confluence in Punjab, Pakistan. It lies between 30° 35' and 32° 50' N. and 71° 50' and 75° 3' E. The name was given by the Mughal emperor Akbar, by combining the first syllables of the names of the two rivers.

Districts 
Rachna doab covers Narowal District, Sialkot District, Jammu District, Kathua District, Gujranwala District, Hafizabad District, Sheikhupura District, Nankana Sahib District, Faisalabad District, Toba Tek Singh District, Chiniot District (excluding Lalian Tehsil) and Jhang District (excluding Athara Hazari Tehsil and Ahmedpur Sial Tehsil).

Major cities 
Major cities of this doab are Narowal, Sialkot, Jammu, Gujranwala, Faisalabad, Sheikhupura, Narowal, Toba Tek Singh, Jhang, Hafizabad, and Wazirabad.

See also
 Indus Sagar Doab
 Chaj Doab
 Bari Doab

References

Doabs of Punjab, Pakistan
Geography of Punjab, Pakistan
Punjab
Punjab, Pakistan
Regions of Punjab, Pakistan